The 1922 VFL season was the 26th season of the Victorian Football League (VFL), the highest level senior Australian rules football competition in Victoria. The season featured nine clubs, ran from 6 May until 14 October, and comprised a 16-game home-and-away season followed by a finals series featuring the top four clubs.

The premiership was won by the Fitzroy Football Club for the seventh time, after it defeated  by eleven points in the 1922 VFL Grand Final.

Premiership season
In 1922, the VFL competition consisted of nine teams of 18 on-the-field players each, with no "reserves", although any of the 18 players who had left the playing field for any reason could later resume their place on the field at any time during the match.

Each team played each other twice in a home-and-away season of 18 rounds (i.e., 16 matches and 2 byes).

Once the 18 round home-and-away season had finished, the 1922 VFL Premiers were determined by the specific format and conventions of the amended "Argus system".

Round 1

|- bgcolor="#CCCCFF"
| Home team
| Home team score
| Away team
| Away team score
| Venue
| Crowd
| Date
|- bgcolor="#FFFFFF"
| 
| 7.13 (55)
| 
| 8.12 (60)
| Lake Oval
| 15,000
| 6 May 1922
|- bgcolor="#FFFFFF"
| 
| 8.8 (56)
| 
| 10.9 (69)
| Junction Oval
| 12,000
| 6 May 1922
|- bgcolor="#FFFFFF"
| 
| 10.13 (73)
| 
| 8.8 (56)
| Punt Road Oval
| 27,000
| 6 May 1922
|- bgcolor="#FFFFFF"
| 
| 11.14 (80)
| 
| 9.8 (62)
| Windy Hill
| 22,000
| 6 May 1922

Round 2

|- bgcolor="#CCCCFF"
| Home team
| Home team score
| Away team
| Away team score
| Venue
| Crowd
| Date
|- bgcolor="#FFFFFF"
| 
| 13.10 (88)
| 
| 12.13 (85)
| MCG
| 23,902
| 13 May 1922
|- bgcolor="#FFFFFF"
| 
| 9.12 (66)
| 
| 10.12 (72)
| Victoria Park
| 20,000
| 13 May 1922
|- bgcolor="#FFFFFF"
| 
| 10.13 (73)
| 
| 9.9 (63)
| Princes Park
| 25,000
| 13 May 1922
|- bgcolor="#FFFFFF"
| 
| 6.6 (42)
| 
| 8.16 (64)
| Corio Oval
| 12,000
| 13 May 1922

Round 3

|- bgcolor="#CCCCFF"
| Home team
| Home team score
| Away team
| Away team score
| Venue
| Crowd
| Date
|- bgcolor="#FFFFFF"
| 
| 14.13 (97)
| 
| 10.12 (72)
| Brunswick Street Oval
| 12,000
| 20 May 1922
|- bgcolor="#FFFFFF"
| 
| 12.12 (84)
| 
| 8.13 (61)
| Windy Hill
| 20,000
| 20 May 1922
|- bgcolor="#FFFFFF"
| 
| 12.12 (84)
| 
| 11.8 (74)
| Junction Oval
| 10,000
| 20 May 1922
|- bgcolor="#FFFFFF"
| 
| 10.18 (78)
| 
| 10.11 (71)
| Victoria Park
| 25,000
| 20 May 1922

Round 4

|- bgcolor="#CCCCFF"
| Home team
| Home team score
| Away team
| Away team score
| Venue
| Crowd
| Date
|- bgcolor="#FFFFFF"
| 
| 11.9 (75)
| 
| 11.7 (73)
| Corio Oval
| 12,000
| 27 May 1922
|- bgcolor="#FFFFFF"
| 
| 14.12 (96)
| 
| 8.16 (64)
| Princes Park
| 15,000
| 27 May 1922
|- bgcolor="#FFFFFF"
| 
| 8.13 (61)
| 
| 12.5 (77)
| Lake Oval
| 20,000
| 27 May 1922
|- bgcolor="#FFFFFF"
| 
| 6.15 (51)
| 
| 7.9 (51)
| Brunswick Street Oval
| 26,000
| 27 May 1922

Round 5

|- bgcolor="#CCCCFF"
| Home team
| Home team score
| Away team
| Away team score
| Venue
| Crowd
| Date
|- bgcolor="#FFFFFF"
| 
| 15.14 (104)
| 
| 4.11 (35)
| Victoria Park
| 30,000
| 3 June 1922
|- bgcolor="#FFFFFF"
| 
| 8.15 (63)
| 
| 4.11 (35)
| Lake Oval
| 25,000
| 3 June 1922
|- bgcolor="#FFFFFF"
| 
| 9.12 (66)
| 
| 9.6 (60)
| MCG
| 16,189
| 5 June 1922
|- bgcolor="#FFFFFF"
| 
| 7.12 (54)
| 
| 9.10 (64)
| Punt Road Oval
| 40,000
| 5 June 1922

Round 6

|- bgcolor="#CCCCFF"
| Home team
| Home team score
| Away team
| Away team score
| Venue
| Crowd
| Date
|- bgcolor="#FFFFFF"
| 
| 9.18 (72)
| 
| 7.9 (51)
| Brunswick Street Oval
| 30,000
| 10 June 1922
|- bgcolor="#FFFFFF"
| 
| 12.21 (93)
| 
| 5.12 (42)
| Windy Hill
| 15,000
| 10 June 1922
|- bgcolor="#FFFFFF"
| 
| 13.19 (97)
| 
| 12.14 (86)
| Princes Park
| 15,000
| 10 June 1922
|- bgcolor="#FFFFFF"
| 
| 8.9 (57)
| 
| 19.6 (120)
| Corio Oval
| 12,000
| 10 June 1922

Round 7

|- bgcolor="#CCCCFF"
| Home team
| Home team score
| Away team
| Away team score
| Venue
| Crowd
| Date
|- bgcolor="#FFFFFF"
| 
| 15.10 (100)
| 
| 10.8 (68)
| Victoria Park
| 30,000
| 17 June 1922
|- bgcolor="#FFFFFF"
| 
| 8.15 (63)
| 
| 9.19 (73)
| Princes Park
| 12,000
| 17 June 1922
|- bgcolor="#FFFFFF"
| 
| 10.14 (74)
| 
| 12.7 (79)
| Lake Oval
| 20,000
| 17 June 1922
|- bgcolor="#FFFFFF"
| 
| 13.11 (89)
| 
| 15.7 (97)
| Junction Oval
| 20,000
| 17 June 1922

Round 8

|- bgcolor="#CCCCFF"
| Home team
| Home team score
| Away team
| Away team score
| Venue
| Crowd
| Date
|- bgcolor="#FFFFFF"
| 
| 7.12 (54)
| 
| 10.5 (65)
| Corio Oval
| 12,000
| 24 June 1922
|- bgcolor="#FFFFFF"
| 
| 9.13 (67)
| 
| 8.8 (56)
| Brunswick Street Oval
| 20,000
| 24 June 1922
|- bgcolor="#FFFFFF"
| 
| 9.13 (67)
| 
| 7.17 (59)
| MCG
| 17,496
| 24 June 1922
|- bgcolor="#FFFFFF"
| 
| 10.6 (66)
| 
| 12.11 (83)
| Punt Road Oval
| 30,000
| 24 June 1922

Round 9

|- bgcolor="#CCCCFF"
| Home team
| Home team score
| Away team
| Away team score
| Venue
| Crowd
| Date
|- bgcolor="#FFFFFF"
| 
| 11.13 (79)
| 
| 7.12 (54)
| Punt Road Oval
| 25,000
| 1 July 1922
|- bgcolor="#FFFFFF"
| 
| 16.18 (114)
| 
| 4.6 (30)
| Corio Oval
| 8,000
| 1 July 1922
|- bgcolor="#FFFFFF"
| 
| 5.19 (49)
| 
| 4.9 (33)
| Brunswick Street Oval
| 12,000
| 1 July 1922
|- bgcolor="#FFFFFF"
| 
| 7.14 (56)
| 
| 10.5 (65)
| Windy Hill
| 30,000
| 1 July 1922

Round 10

|- bgcolor="#CCCCFF"
| Home team
| Home team score
| Away team
| Away team score
| Venue
| Crowd
| Date
|- bgcolor="#FFFFFF"
| 
| 15.10 (100)
| 
| 9.18 (72)
| MCG
| 9,850
| 15 July 1922
|- bgcolor="#FFFFFF"
| 
| 13.11 (89)
| 
| 8.14 (62)
| Brunswick Street Oval
| 17,000
| 15 July 1922
|- bgcolor="#FFFFFF"
| 
| 6.14 (50)
| 
| 3.13 (31)
| Victoria Park
| 25,000
| 15 July 1922
|- bgcolor="#FFFFFF"
| 
| 11.19 (85)
| 
| 7.10 (52)
| Princes Park
| 30,000
| 15 July 1922

Round 11

|- bgcolor="#CCCCFF"
| Home team
| Home team score
| Away team
| Away team score
| Venue
| Crowd
| Date
|- bgcolor="#FFFFFF"
| 
| 12.10 (82)
| 
| 13.16 (94)
| Windy Hill
| 15,000
| 22 July 1922
|- bgcolor="#FFFFFF"
| 
| 11.14 (80)
| 
| 10.17 (77)
| Punt Road Oval
| 18,000
| 22 July 1922
|- bgcolor="#FFFFFF"
| 
| 7.14 (56)
| 
| 8.16 (64)
| Lake Oval
| 20,000
| 22 July 1922
|- bgcolor="#FFFFFF"
| 
| 11.13 (79)
| 
| 9.7 (61)
| Brunswick Street Oval
| 30,000
| 22 July 1922

Round 12

|- bgcolor="#CCCCFF"
| Home team
| Home team score
| Away team
| Away team score
| Venue
| Crowd
| Date
|- bgcolor="#FFFFFF"
| 
| 13.10 (88)
| 
| 11.10 (76)
| MCG
| 14,929
| 29 July 1922
|- bgcolor="#FFFFFF"
| 
| 12.16 (88)
| 
| 11.17 (83)
| Princes Park
| 34,000
| 29 July 1922
|- bgcolor="#FFFFFF"
| 
| 5.9 (39)
| 
| 5.19 (49)
| Corio Oval
| 15,000
| 29 July 1922
|- bgcolor="#FFFFFF"
| 
| 14.15 (99)
| 
| 11.8 (74)
| Lake Oval
| 20,000
| 29 July 1922

Round 13

|- bgcolor="#CCCCFF"
| Home team
| Home team score
| Away team
| Away team score
| Venue
| Crowd
| Date
|- bgcolor="#FFFFFF"
| 
| 10.15 (75)
| 
| 11.9 (75)
| Junction Oval
| 15,000
| 5 August 1922
|- bgcolor="#FFFFFF"
| 
| 15.7 (97)
| 
| 12.16 (88)
| Windy Hill
| 20,000
| 5 August 1922
|- bgcolor="#FFFFFF"
| 
| 12.17 (89)
| 
| 11.13 (79)
| Punt Road Oval
| 15,000
| 5 August 1922
|- bgcolor="#FFFFFF"
| 
| 10.4 (64)
| 
| 8.13 (61)
| MCG
| 25,220
| 5 August 1922

Round 14

|- bgcolor="#CCCCFF"
| Home team
| Home team score
| Away team
| Away team score
| Venue
| Crowd
| Date
|- bgcolor="#FFFFFF"
| 
| 11.6 (72)
| 
| 5.16 (46)
| Corio Oval
| 8,000
| 19 August 1922
|- bgcolor="#FFFFFF"
| 
| 15.13 (103)
| 
| 10.6 (66)
| Windy Hill
| 25,000
| 19 August 1922
|- bgcolor="#FFFFFF"
| 
| 14.19 (103)
| 
| 10.15 (75)
| Princes Park
| 17,000
| 19 August 1922
|- bgcolor="#FFFFFF"
| 
| 6.10 (46)
| 
| 8.9 (57)
| Junction Oval
| 18,000
| 19 August 1922

Round 15

|- bgcolor="#CCCCFF"
| Home team
| Home team score
| Away team
| Away team score
| Venue
| Crowd
| Date
|- bgcolor="#FFFFFF"
| 
| 8.20 (68)
| 
| 6.8 (44)
| Victoria Park
| 8,000
| 26 August 1922
|- bgcolor="#FFFFFF"
| 
| 5.10 (40)
| 
| 3.14 (32)
| Punt Road Oval
| 5,000
| 26 August 1922
|- bgcolor="#FFFFFF"
| 
| 3.10 (28)
| 
| 6.8 (44)
| MCG
| 19,206
| 26 August 1922
|- bgcolor="#FFFFFF"
| 
| 4.16 (40)
| 
| 5.19 (49)
| Junction Oval
| 10,000
| 26 August 1922

Round 16

|- bgcolor="#CCCCFF"
| Home team
| Home team score
| Away team
| Away team score
| Venue
| Crowd
| Date
|- bgcolor="#FFFFFF"
| 
| 13.8 (86)
| 
| 9.10 (64)
| Punt Road Oval
| 15,000
| 2 September 1922
|- bgcolor="#FFFFFF"
| 
| 8.15 (63)
| 
| 8.7 (55)
| Windy Hill
| 15,000
| 2 September 1922
|- bgcolor="#FFFFFF"
| 
| 8.14 (62)
| 
| 11.13 (79)
| Brunswick Street Oval
| 25,000
| 2 September 1922
|- bgcolor="#FFFFFF"
| 
| 11.10 (76)
| 
| 16.15 (111)
| Corio Oval
| 15,000
| 2 September 1922

Round 17

|- bgcolor="#CCCCFF"
| Home team
| Home team score
| Away team
| Away team score
| Venue
| Crowd
| Date
|- bgcolor="#FFFFFF"
| 
| 11.16 (82)
| 
| 7.11 (53)
| Victoria Park
| 15,000
| 9 September 1922
|- bgcolor="#FFFFFF"
| 
| 14.10 (94)
| 
| 7.8 (50)
| Princes Park
| 25,000
| 9 September 1922
|- bgcolor="#FFFFFF"
| 
| 18.18 (126)
| 
| 10.11 (71)
| Junction Oval
| 10,000
| 9 September 1922
|- bgcolor="#FFFFFF"
| 
| 11.12 (78)
| 
| 14.9 (93)
| Lake Oval
| 10,000
| 9 September 1922

Round 18

|- bgcolor="#CCCCFF"
| Home team
| Home team score
| Away team
| Away team score
| Venue
| Crowd
| Date
|- bgcolor="#FFFFFF"
| 
| 6.11 (47)
| 
| 6.7 (43)
| Victoria Park
| 32,000
| 16 September 1922
|- bgcolor="#FFFFFF"
| 
| 7.22 (64)
| 
| 5.7 (37)
| Junction Oval
| 4,000
| 16 September 1922
|- bgcolor="#FFFFFF"
| 
| 21.10 (136)
| 
| 8.10 (58)
| Lake Oval
| 3,000
| 16 September 1922
|- bgcolor="#FFFFFF"
| 
| 7.13 (55)
| 
| 8.15 (63)
| Princes Park
| 5,000
| 16 September 1922

Ladder

Finals

All of the 1922 finals were played at the MCG so the home team in the semi-finals and preliminary final is purely the higher ranked team from the ladder but in the Grand Final the home team was the team that won the preliminary final.

Semi-finals

|- bgcolor="#CCCCFF"
| Home team
| Score
| Away team
| Score
| Venue
| Crowd
| Date
|- bgcolor="#FFFFFF"
| 
| 5.9 (39)
| 
| 4.10 (34)
| MCG
| 64,148
| 23 September
|- bgcolor="#FFFFFF"
| Collingwood
| 5.12 (42)
| 
| 6.10 (46)
| MCG
| 43,045
| 30 September

Preliminary final

|- bgcolor="#CCCCFF"
| Home team
| Score
| Away team
| Score
| Venue
| Crowd
| Date
|- bgcolor="#FFFFFF"
| 
| 9.14 (68)
| 
| 6.9 (45)
| MCG
| 50,021
| 7 October

Grand final

Fitzroy defeated Collingwood 11.13 (79) to 9.14 (68), in front of a crowd of 50,064 people. (For an explanation of scoring see Australian rules football).

Awards
 The 1922 VFL Premiership team was Fitzroy.
 The VFL's leading goalkicker was Horrie Clover of Carlton with 54 goals (56 after finals).
 South Melbourne took the "wooden spoon" in 1922.
 The Victorian Junior League premiership, which is today recognised as the VFL reserves premiership, was won by 's team, Collingwood District. Collingwood District 8.10 (58) defeated Essendon Juniors 1.9 (15) in the challenge Grand Final, played as a curtain-raiser to the senior Grand Final on 14 October at the Melbourne Cricket Ground.

Notable events
 Essendon began playing its home games at the Essendon Recreation Reserve (known today as Windy Hill) from this season, after the closure of the East Melbourne Cricket Ground at the end of 1921.
 Boundary umpires became responsible for bringing the ball back to the centre after a goal has been scored.
 Angry Richmond fans invaded the field after Richmond's 10-point loss against Essendon in Round 5. Field umpire Arthur Norden, later received a letter threatening his life, and he retired.
 The first issue of the "pink paper", the Saturday evening newspaper, The Sporting Globe, was published on 22 July 1922.
 In the round 17 match against Geelong, St Kilda's centre half-forward Dave McNamara had 12 kicks for the match. From the twelve kicks he scored ten goals, nine of them with place-kicks (one 70 yards, another 65 yards), and tenth with a punt-kick. By contrast with that accurate kicking, on the following Saturday, in the round 18 match against Richmond, McNamara kicked 1.13 (19).
 South Melbourne's percentage is the highest ever by the team finishing last.

Footnotes

References  
 Maplestone, M., Flying Higher: History of the Essendon Football Club 1872–1996, Essendon Football Club, (Melbourne), 1996. 
 Rogers, S. & Brown, A., Every Game Ever Played: VFL/AFL Results 1897–1997 (Sixth Edition), Viking Books, (Ringwood), 1998. 
 Ross, J. (ed), 100 Years of Australian Football 1897–1996: The Complete Story of the AFL, All the Big Stories, All the Great Pictures, All the Champions, Every AFL Season Reported, Viking, (Ringwood), 1996.

External links
 1922 Season - AFL Tables

Australian Football League seasons
VFL